Bushwacker #13/6 (born June 1, 2006) is an American former bucking bull. He competed in the Professional Bull Riders (PBR) circuit and was a three-time PBR World Champion Bull, winning the title in 2011, 2013, and 2014. His three titles match the record established a decade earlier by Little Yellow Jacket from 2002 to 2004. He was awarded the PBR Brand of Honor in 2016. He has been referred to as the "Michael Jordan of Bulls." In 2014, PBR co-founder and Director of Livestock Cody Lambert compared Bushwacker to the likes of Secretariat and Seabiscuit. He was inducted into the Class of 2020 in the Bull Riding Hall of Fame in August.

Background 
Bushwacker was sired by #A67 Reindeer Dippin and Lady Luck. Reindeer Dippin was born and raised in Maryville. Reindeer Dippin was the Bucking Bull of the Finals at the 2004 NFR. Reindeer Dippin's father is from Naccarato breeding on his sire's side and his mother is AN 11, an #34 Oscar's Velvet daughter. And Oscar's Velvet is sired by the ProRodeo Hall of Fame bull Oscar. Lady Luck's father was Diamond's Ghost. She was raised by David Fournier and acquired by Mikel. David Fournier and Julio Moreno traded a few heifers each year at the American Bucking Bull, Inc. (ABBI) event in Weatherford, Texas – one of these was Lady Luck. "Julio told me, 'You know, Bushwacker’s out of one of your cows' and when he (first) showed it to me, I knew exactly which one. "But I had gotten rid of her mother already," Fourner said.

Bushwacker was born in Marysville, California, on June 1, 2006. In 2008, as a two-year-old, he moved to Stephenville, Texas, to work with the late handler Kent Cox. Kent Cox hauled and raised many of Julio Moreno's bulls since 2005.
Bushwacker is currently owned by Julio Moreno of Julio Moreno Bucking Bulls. Now retired, he is used for natural breeding and may have as many as 20 cows with him in the spring. Moreno maintains a Facebook page devoted to Bushwacker. Bushwacker has a Twitter account also, but it has been inactive since 2014 when he retired. Bushwacker's last public appearance was at the PBR World Finals in 2016.

Career 
His notoriety was cemented during a PBR-record streak of 42 consecutive buckoffs, and 56 buckoffs in all levels of competition. It started after being ridden by Thiago Paguioto, and after that, no one would stay on him again until August 2013, when J.B. Mauney was finally successful in riding him after nine previous tries.

Bushwacker is a bull who spent the majority of his career on the Built Ford Tough Series (BFTS), the major leagues of the PBR. Bushwacker only bucked in the Championship rounds and the 15/15 Bucking Battles, which means only the best riders got to try him. According to Probullstats.com, he had 87 outs with 3 qualified rides at all levels of competition. Of those, 66 outs and 2 qualified rides were on the BFTS. In October 2009, Markus Mariluch was the first to ride Bushwacker in the PBR for 88 points in Las Vegas, but this was not on the BFTS. Then, also in October 2009, Thiago Paguioto was the first to ride Bushwacker on the BFTS in Las Vegas for 89.75 points, and then his buckoff streak started after this ride. Then, the 42 buckoff streak was broken by J.B. Mauney on the BFTS at Tulsa, Oklahoma, for 95.25 points. The bull scored 46.75 on the ride. Bushwacker would not be ridden again, and he retired after the PBR World Finals in 2014. That record of 64 buck offs in 66 BFTS outs ranks him eighth in all-time buckoffs to date. His career BFTS buckoff percentage is 96.969 percent. He also earned an average bull score of 46.162 points.

Throughout his six-year BFTS elite career, Bushwacker "became a world-famous superstar". During his retirement in 2014, PBR co-founder and Director of Livestock Cody Lambert compared Bushwacker with other preeminent animal athletes Secretariat and Seabiscuit. When asked what Bushwacker has meant to the PBR, Lambert took his remarks further. He immediately placed Bushwacker in an exclusive class of PBR legends, alongside others like the first and three-time World Champion Adriano Moraes or two-time World Champions Chris Shivers and Justin McBride. "He is as important to the sport as any of the riders we have ever had and more famous than most of them and more well known," Lambert said. "We will have all of the great bulls from now on, and all of the great bull riders from now on, and we will never replace Bushwacker or Chris Shivers or Justin McBride or Adriano. We have fans that don’t know any of the riders' names that know Bushwacker," Lambert said. "Lots of them. It's a level that no animal has taken it to so far – until Bushwacker."

Retirement 
Moreno retired Bushwacker from competition in October 2014 after winning his third World Champion Bull title. When the PBR awarded Bushwacker the PBR Brand of Honor, Julio brought him to "accept" the award in person in Las Vegas during the PBR World Finals in Oct-Nov 2016. The PBR actually built a stage for Bushwacker inside the South Point Hotel, Casino & Spa where the awards were held. This is the first time an animal has been on stage to receive an award for the PBR. J.B. Mauney attended and spoke fondly about his longtime rival.

"I hung on to him long enough for them to say I made the whistle, but in my eyes he is the greatest bucking bull there will ever be," Mauney said. "People will raise bulls their entire life and they will never have a bull like Bushwacker. It couldn’t have happened to any better gentleman that I know than Julio Moreno." Mauney and Bushwacker met 13 times in Bushwacker's career. Bushwacker bucked Mauney off in all but one of those rides. The always superstitious Moreno said, "I thank J.B. J.B. was on him 13 times and Bushwacker’s number is 13. It kind of worked out good like that."

Honors 
 2009 ABBI (American Bucking Bull, Inc.) Reserve Wild Card Champion
 2010 ABBI World Champion Classic Bull & $250,000 winner
 2011 PBR Bull of the World Finals
 2011 High Marked Bull 9 times
 2011 PBR World Champion Bull
 2013 PBR Bull of the World Finals
 2013 PBR World Champion Bull
 2014 PBR World Champion Bull
 Holds the PBR Premier Series record for 42 consecutive buckoffs
 2016 PBR Brand of Honor
 2020 Bull Riding Hall of Fame
 ProBullStats Hall of Fame

References

External links
 Bushwacker stats Bushwacker's profile on Probullstats
 Bushwacker Facebook page
Videos
 Julio Moreno, Owner Of Bushwacker, Talks With Jason Hetland YouTube Video
 ESPN E:60 Bushwacker ESPN TV Show clip YouTube video
 Bushwacker: 'He is Muhammad Ali' (PBR) Official YouTube video
 Bushwacker: The PBR Legend to Retire (PBR) Official PBR video

2006 animal births
Bucking bulls
Individual bulls in sport
Professional Bull Riders: Heroes and Legends